This list comprises all players who have participated in at least one league match for the Wilmington Hammerheads FC since the USL began keeping archived records in 2003. Players who were on the roster but never played a first-team game are not listed; players who appeared for the team in other competitions (US Open Cup, CONCACAF Champions League, etc.) but never actually made an USL appearance are noted at the bottom of the page where appropriate.

A "†" denotes players who only appeared in a single match.
A "*" denotes players who are known to have appeared for the team prior to 2003.

A
  Brian Ackley
  Trey Alexander
  Pablo Álvarez
  Calum Angus
  Brian Anunga
  Manny Aparicio
  Cody Arnoux
  Matt Avellino
  Jack Avesyan
  Eric Ati

B
  Chris Bagley
  Chris Banks
  Devlin Barnes
  Diego Barrera
  Mickael Oliveira Barroso
  Christian Bassogog
  Nicholas Beasant
  Ivan Becerra
  Brian Bell
  Uriah Bentick
  Yeniel Bermudez
  Nicholas Bochette
  Josh Bolton
  Corben Bone
  Daniele Bragoli
  Mark Briggs
  Connor Brandt †
  Brady Bryant
  Andriy Budnyi
  Kenny Bundy
  Jon Burklo

C
  Michael Calderón
  Andrae Campbell
  Daniel Capecci
  Keith Cardona †
  Devan Carroll
  Paul Chase
  Chukwudi Chijindu
  Hagop Chirishian
  Ben Clark
  Troy Cole
 Mael Corboz
  George Corrie
  David Cowley
  Chad Crandell
  Bart Creasman
  Andres Cuero
  Jack Cummings
  Steven Curfman
  Brandon Curran
  Brian Cvilikas
Bucky Corban

D
  Michael Daly
  Christian Davidson
  Stefan Defregger
  John DeVae
  Zeke Dombrowski
  Brock Duckworth
  Matt Dunn †

E
  Albert Edward
  Cory Elenio
  Gareth Evans

F
  Ashani Fairclough
  Colin Falvey
  Michael Fitzgerald
  Willie Files
  Jamie Franks

G
  Derek Garrambone
  James Gledhill
  Marc Godelman
  Ashley Good
  Graham Goulding
  Matt Gleaser
  Kyle Greig
  Alex Grendi
  Manny Guzman

H
  Jeremy Hall
  Jordan Hamilton
  Alex Harrison
  Matthew Harrison
  William Heaney
  Troy Hernandez
  Ben Hill
  Jamie Holmes
  Luke Holmes
  Alex Horwath
  Jason Hotchkin
  Anthony Hudson
  Philip Hufstader
  Jeff Hughes
  Jordan Hughes
  Corey Hertzog

I
  Luke Ibbetson
  Richard Isberner

J
  Larry Jackson
  Jordan James
  Sunny Jane
  Richard Jata
  Eirik Johansen †

K
  Tim Karalexis
  Mark-Anthony Kaye
  Johnnie Keen
  Tyler Kettering
  Thabiso Khumalo
  Aaron King
  Zach Kirby
  John Krause
  Leo Krupnik

L
  Martyn Lancaster
  Tyler Lassiter
  Qudus Lawal
  Troy Lesesne
  Thomas Lindal
  Phillip Long
  Daniel Lovitz

M
  Ross MacKenzie
  Anthony Maher
  Fran Martínez
  Landy Mattison
  Chris McClellan
  Joe McNab
  Thomas McNamara
  Andrés Mendoza
  Steven Miller
  Justin Moose
  Luke Mulholland
  Chris Murray
  Glenn Murray
  Stephen Murray
  Yahaya Musa

N
  Mark Nerkowski
  Paul Nicholson
  Shawn Nicklaw
  Nate Northup
  Jyler Noviello
  Charles Nweke
  Kevin Nylen

O
  Sammy Ochoa
  John O'Hara
  David Obua

P
  Aaron Parker
  Tom Parratt
  Arron Patrick
  John Payne
  Shawn Pence
  Drew Perry
  Steven Perry
  Anthony Peters
  Rusty Pierce
  Billy Platz
  Kwadwo Poku †
  Kyle Polak
  Kristopher Pollard
  Derek Popovich

R
  Andre Rawls
  Tommy Redding †
  Chris Riley
  Dylan Riley
  Daniel Roberts
  Quillan Roberts
  Charles Rodriguez
  Jose Romero
  Jeffrey Rowland
  Daniel Ruch
  Bill Rudisill
  Drew Ruggles

S
  Daryl Sattler
   Scott Schweitzer
  Jamie Scope †
  Montae Seabrook
  Chad Severs
  Andrew Smith
  Josh Smith
  Ryan Solle
  Adam Smith
  Chris Spendlove
  Daniel Steres
  Brad Stuver

T
  Patrick Tate
  Graham Tatters
  Zev Taublieb
  Bryce Taylor
  Kevin Taylor
  Tom Taylor
  Jeritt Thayer
  Ross Tomaselli
  Michael Thompson
  Ashleigh Townsend
  Phil Tuttle

U
  Shaun Utterson

W
  Ryan Walker
  Jamel Wallace
  Dame Walters
  Jamie Watson
  Gannon Webb
  Aaron Wheeler
  Keith Wiggans
  Adam Williamson
  Kieran Wilson
  Tanner Wolfe
  Anthony Wright

Z
  Junior Zarate
  Nick Zimmerman

Sources

Wilmington Hammerheads
 
Association football player non-biographical articles